Frances Leonard (born 23 August 1964 in Mildura, Victoria) is an Australian former cricket player.

Leonard played domestic cricket for the Australian Capital Territory women's cricket team between 1978 and 1982 and the Western Australian women's cricket team between 1985 and 1990. She played eleven "List A cricket" limited overs matches.

Leonard played one One Day International for the Australia national women's cricket team.

References

External links
 Frances Leonard at southernstars.org.au

Living people
1964 births
Australia women One Day International cricketers